Potiguar may refer to:

 Demonym of Rio Grande do Norte state, Brazil
 Potiguara people
 Campeonato Potiguar, a Brazilian football (soccer) competition
 Associação Cultural e Desportiva Potiguar, a Brazilian football (soccer) club
 Associação Cultural e Desportiva Potyguar Seridoense, a Brazilian football (soccer) club